

Foul Bay is a locality in the  Australian state  of  South Australia located on the south coast of Yorke Peninsula immediately adjoining Investigator Strait about  west of the state capital of Adelaide.

It was formally established in May 1999, with its name deriving from the Foul Bay Shack Site on South Coast Road. It also incorporates the pre-existing "Old Wheel Inn Shack Site" and the "Point Davenport Shack Site". A government town named Nugent was surveyed at the end of Nugent Road, near the Point Davenport site, in July 1880; however, it was never developed and was declared to have ceased to exist on 11 June 1925. In 2012, a portion of Foul Bay was added to Warooka.

As of 2014, the majority land use within the locality was “primary production.”

The 2016 census reported that Foul Bay had a population of 41 people.

Foul Bay is located within the federal division of Grey, the state electoral district of Narungga and the local government area of the Yorke Peninsula Council.

See also
List of cities and towns in South Australia

References

Towns in South Australia
Yorke Peninsula